Robert Anderson Hall Jr. (April 4, 1911December 2, 1997) was an American linguist and specialist in the Romance languages. He was a professor of Linguistics at Cornell University and the first president of The Wodehouse Society (US).

Hall was an early promoter of the linguistics of Creole languages, and published broadly within the field. Under the auspices of the United States Armed Services Institute, he wrote a structuralist description of Melanesian Pidgin English in 1943. Among other creoles and pidgin languages, he studied Sranan of Surinam and Haitian Creole.

Hall organized the successful spoken language learning method for soldiers in the Second World War.

Hall criticized Basic English because it encouraged the use of multi-meaning words (such as get) under the guise of simplicity.

Hall took the controversial view that the Kensington Runestone, a purported relic of an early Viking visit to what is now Minnesota in North America, was authentic.

Hall was an outspoken critic of the generative tradition of linguistics emanating from Noam Chomsky, for example remarking that "Chomskyan transformationalism rejects a scientific approach for an anti-scientific one."

Notable works
An Analytical Grammar of the Hungarian Language (1938)
Melanesian Pidgin English: Grammar, Texts, Vocabulary (1943)
New Ways to Learn a Foreign Language (1946) 
Leave Your Language Alone (1950)
Haitian Creole: Grammar, Texts, Vocabulary (1953)
Hands Off Pidgin English! (1955)
Italian for Modern Living (1959, repr. 1974)
Idealism in Romance Linguistics (1963)
Introductory Linguistics (1964)
Pidgin and Creole Languages (1966)
An Essay on Language (1968)
External History of the Romance Languages (1974)
The Comic Style of P. G. Wodehouse (1974)
Stormy Petrel in Linguistics (essays, some polemics) (1975)
American Linguistics: 1925-1969. Three essays with a Preface to the Reprint. Darmstadt: Wissenschaftliche Buchgesellschaft (1976)
Proto-Romance Phonology (1976)
Language, Literature, and Life (selected essays) (1978)
Linguistics and Pseudo-Linguistics (selected essays) (1978)
The Kensington Rune-Stone is Genuine (1982)
A Life for Language: a Biographical Memoir of Leonard Bloomfield (1990)

References

External links
 Obituary

Linguists from the United States
1911 births
1997 deaths
20th-century linguists